Ethan Andrew Canin (born July 19, 1960) is an American author, educator, and physician. He is a member of the faculty of the Iowa Writers' Workshop at the University of Iowa.

Canin was born in Ann Arbor, Michigan, while his parents were vacationing from Iowa City, where his father, Stuart Canin, taught violin at the University of Iowa. He and his family moved around the midwestern and northeastern United States, and eventually settled in San Francisco, California, where he attended Town School and later graduated from San Francisco University High School. He attended Stanford University and earned an undergraduate degree in English. Returning to the University of Iowa, Canin entered the Iowa Writers' Workshop, receiving an MFA in 1984, and went on to attend Harvard Medical School, where he earned an M.D. in 1991.

Beginning his medical practice with a residency at the University of California San Francisco, he pursued both medicine and writing for several years, leaving medicine in 1995 to join the faculty of the Iowa Writers' Workshop, where he still teaches. He is a co-founder of the San Francisco Writers Grotto.

Married with three daughters, Canin is of Jewish background.

Awards

The Houghton Mifflin Literary Fellowship (1986)
Henfield/Transatlantic Review Prize (1987)
The California Book Award/Gold Medal in Literature (1994)
The Lyndhurst Prize (1994–1996)
National Endowment for the Arts Fellowship (1987 & 1996)
Guggenheim Fellowship (2010)

Writing

Short story collections
Emperor of the Air (1985)
The Palace Thief (1994)

Novels
Blue River (1992) Time Warner International 
For Kings and Planets (1999) Saint Martin's press Inc. 
Carry Me Across the Water (2001) Bloomsbury Publishing PLC. 
America America (2009) Bloomsbury Publishing PLC. 
A Doubter's Almanac: A Novel (2016) Random House

Filmography

Several of Canin's novels and short stories have been adapted for film.

Short films

Emperor of the Air (1996) dir. Ali Selim

Feature films

Blue River (1995) dir. Larry Elikann, based on the novel of the same name
The Emperor's Club (2002) dir. Michael Hoffman, based on the 1994 short story "The Palace Thief"
Beautiful Ohio (2006) dir. Chad Lowe, based on the 1994 short story "Batorsag and Szerelem"
The Year of Getting to Know Us (2008) dir. Patrick Sisam, based on the 1988 story "Star Food" and the 1987 story "The Year of Getting to Know Us"

References

Notes

External links
Ethan Canin's Official Web Site
 

20th-century American novelists
Physicians from Iowa
University of Iowa alumni
Harvard Medical School alumni
Writers from Ann Arbor, Michigan
Writers from San Francisco
Stanford University alumni
Iowa Writers' Workshop alumni
Iowa Writers' Workshop faculty
1960 births
Living people
21st-century American novelists
American male novelists
University of California, San Francisco alumni
20th-century American male writers
21st-century American male writers
Novelists from Michigan
Novelists from Iowa